The Ireland cricket team toured England in July and August 2020 to play three One Day International (ODI) matches. Originally due to take place in September 2020, the schedule for the series was rearranged due to the COVID-19 pandemic. All of the fixtures were played behind closed doors, at the Rose Bowl in Southampton, due to the pandemic. The teams last faced each other in a one-off ODI in Dublin in May 2019, with England winning by four wickets.

The ODI matches formed part of the inaugural 2020–2023 ICC Cricket World Cup Super League, and they were the first matches of the league. Following a trial that started in December 2019, the International Cricket Council (ICC) announced the use of technology to monitor front-foot no-balls for all matches in the Super League. The third umpire called the front-foot no-balls, communicating this with the on-field umpires.

England won the first two ODI matches to take an unassailable series lead. England won the series 2–1, after Ireland won the third and final match of the series. It was Ireland's first win in an ODI against England in England.

Background
In April 2020, Cricket Ireland's chief executive, Warren Deutrom, said that Ireland will be "very flexible" with regards to possibly rescheduling the fixtures due to the COVID-19 pandemic. This included the possibility of playing all three matches behind closed doors, at a venue with enough capacity for all the stakeholders, such as Old Trafford or the Rose Bowl. In May 2020, Cricket Ireland were asked if they could move the fixtures to the end of July, to accommodate the rescheduling of England's fixtures against Australia. Later the same month, Cricket Ireland confirmed that the scheduling for the matches was still under active discussion, despite the cancellation of their home fixtures against New Zealand and Pakistan.

On 21 May 2020, a revised schedule due to the pandemic was issued, with all three matches taking place at Old Trafford, starting on 30 July 2020. However, the venue was later changed to the Rose Bowl in  Southampton. The series was originally scheduled to take place in September 2020, at Trent Bridge, Edgbaston and The Oval. A week later, the UK government published updated guidance on the resumption of training for elite sports. On 29 May 2020, the England and Wales Cricket Board (ECB) named a 55-man group of players to begin training ahead of international fixtures starting in England. On 8 June 2020, Cricket Ireland confirmed that centrally-contracted players would return to training, and that they were still in discussions with the ECB with regards to playing the three matches. Ireland's captain, Andy Balbirnie, said he was hopeful that the series would go ahead, after a "very reassuring" briefing from the ECB. Gary Wilson, Ireland's wicket-keeper, said that "games against England are massive for us" and everyone is "desperate" for the series to go ahead. On 6 July 2020, the ECB gave the go ahead for the series, and confirmed the fixture schedule.

On 17 June 2020, the ECB trimmed the 55-man squad down to a 30-man squad to prepare for the Test matches against the West Indies. On 4 July 2020, England named a thirteen-man squad for the first Test, along with nine reserve players. Some of the cricketers not selected for the Test matches from the initial 30-man squad began preparing for the ODI matches against Ireland. On 9 July 2020, the ECB named a 24-man squad to begin training behind closed doors in preparation for the ODI matches. The next day, Cricket Ireland named a squad of twenty-one players to travel to England. Following the practice matches, fourteen of them will be selected for the ODI squad, with the rest staying in England as cover. On 18 July 2020, Cricket Ireland added Stuart Thompson to their touring squad, ahead of the team's departure from Dublin. On 21 July 2020, the ECB named Moeen Ali as England's vice-captain for the ODI series. On 21 July 2020, Matt Parkinson withdrew from England's 24-man squad, after he suffered an ankle injury.

In June 2020, the International Cricket Council (ICC) made several interim changes to the Playing Conditions due to the pandemic. Players were banned from using saliva to shine the ball, with five penalty runs being awarded to the opposition for repeated transgressions. The requirement to use neutral match officials was temporarily lifted, along with an increase to the number of DRS reviews a team can use, due to having less experienced umpires in a match.

Squads

The ECB named Richard Gleeson, Lewis Gregory and Liam Livingstone as reserve players for the series. Joe Denly was ruled out of England's squad, after suffering from back spasms before the first match. Liam Livingstone replaced Denly in the squad for the remaining fixtures. Ahead of the second ODI, Ireland named Peter Chase and George Dockrell in their squad, replacing Boyd Rankin and Barry McCarthy respectively, after they were both ruled out due to injuries. On the morning of the third and final match, Mark Adair was added to Ireland's squad.

Practice matches
Before the ODI series, Ireland played two practice matches, with the second match against the England Lions. The twenty-four cricketers named in England's training squad also played two intra-squad practice matches. All four games took place at the Rose Bowl.

ODI series

1st ODI

2nd ODI

3rd ODI

References

External links
 Series home at ESPN Cricinfo

2020 in Irish cricket
2020 in English cricket
International cricket competitions in 2020
Irish cricket tours of England